Anglin is an unincorporated community in Okanogan County, in the U.S. state of Washington.

History
A post office called Anglin was established in 1902, and remained in operation until 1921. T. S. Anglin, an early postmaster, gave the community his name.

References

Unincorporated communities in Okanogan County, Washington
Unincorporated communities in Washington (state)